The Chief of Defence Intelligence (CDI) is a Nigerian Military officer from any of the service branches who serves as the head of Nigeria's Defence Intelligence Agency. The CDI is appointed by the President of Nigeria and reports into the Minister of Defence

Chiefs of Defence Intelligence
Below is a list of the current and previous Chiefs of Defence Intelligence

References

Nigerian military appointments
Nigeria
Nigeria